Camanche Village is a census-designated place in Amador County, California. It lies at an elevation of 276 feet (84 m), and has a population of 847.

Demographics

The 2010 United States Census reported that Camanche Village had a population of 847. The racial makeup of Camanche Village was 762 (90.0%) White, 0 (0.0%) African American, 9 (1.1%) Native American, 8 (0.9%) Asian, 4 (0.5%) Pacific Islander, 31 (3.7%) from other races, and 33 (3.9%) from two or more races. Hispanic or Latino of any race were 121 persons (14.3%).

The Census reported that 847 people (100% of the population) lived in households, 0 (0%) lived in non-institutionalized group quarters, and 0 (0%) were institutionalized.

There were 309 households, out of which 115 (37.2%) had children under the age of 18 living in them, 200 (64.7%) were opposite-sex married couples living together, 15 (4.9%) had a female householder with no husband present, 22 (7.1%) had a male householder with no wife present.  There were 19 (6.1%) unmarried opposite-sex partnerships, and 4 (1.3%) same-sex married couples or partnerships. 54 households (17.5%) were made up of individuals, and 11 (3.6%) had someone living alone who was 65 years of age or older. The average household size was 2.74.  There were 237 families (76.7% of all households); the average family size was 3.10.

The population was spread out, with 211 people (24.9%) under the age of 18, 67 people (7.9%) aged 18 to 24, 224 people (26.4%) aged 25 to 44, 253 people (29.9%) aged 45 to 64, and 92 people (10.9%) who were 65 years of age or older.  The median age was 38.7 years. For every 100 females, there were 110.7 males.  For every 100 females age 18 and over, there were 109.2 males.

The homeowner vacancy rate was 3.5%; the rental vacancy rate was 10.3%.  740 people (87.4% of the population) lived in owner-occupied housing units and 107 people (12.6%) lived in rental housing units.

See also
Camanche Dam
Camanche Reservoir

References

Census-designated places in Amador County, California
Census-designated places in California